The 2023 European U23 Wrestling Championships was the 8th edition of the European U23 Wrestling Championships of combined events, and it was held from 13 to 19 March in Bucharest, Romania.

Competition schedule
All times are (UTC+2)

Medal table

Team ranking

Medal overview

Men's freestyle

Men's Greco-Roman

Women's freestyle

Participating nations 
367 wrestlers from 33 countries participated:

  (1)
  (20)
  (2)
  (26)
  (25)
  (5)
  (5)
  (2)
  (4)
  (3)
  (5)
  (14)
  (20)
  (17)
  (11)
  (13)
  (6)
  (12)
  (1)
  (2)
  (9)
  (21)
  (5)
  (3)
  (20)
  (30)
  (7)
  (4)
  (4)
  (9)
  (30)
  (30)
  (1)

Results

Men's freestyle

Men's freestyle 57 kg
 Legend
 F — Won by fall

Men's freestyle 61 kg
 Legend
 F — Won by fall

Men's freestyle 65 kg
 Legend
 F — Won by fall

Men's freestyle 70 kg
 Legend
 F — Won by fall
 WO — Won by walkover

Men's freestyle 74 kg
 Legend
 F — Won by fall

Men's freestyle 79 kg
 Legend
 F — Won by fall

Men's freestyle 86 kg
 Legend
 F — Won by fall

Men's freestyle 92 kg
 Legend
 F — Won by fall

Men's freestyle 97 kg
 Legend
 F — Won by fall

Men's freestyle 125 kg
 Legend
 DSQ — Disqualified
 F — Won by fall
 WO — Won by walkover
 In the match between Solomon Manashvili of Georgia and Vakhit Galayev of Azerbaijan, the referees showed red cards to both wrestlers and disqualified them after a fight broke out after the end of the match. Quarterfinal losers Volodymyr Kochanov of Ukraine and Martin Simonyan of Armenia played a semifinal match again.

Men's Greco-Roman

Men's Greco-Roman 55 kg
 Legend
 F — Won by fall
 DSQ — Disqualified

Men's Greco-Roman 60 kg
 Legend
 F — Won by fall

Men's Greco-Roman 63 kg
 Legend
 F — Won by fall

Men's Greco-Roman 67 kg
 Legend
 F — Won by fall

Men's Greco-Roman 72 kg
 Legend
 F — Won by fall

Men's Greco-Roman 77 kg
 Legend
 F — Won by fall

Men's Greco-Roman 82 kg
 Legend
 F — Won by fall

Men's Greco-Roman 87 kg
 Legend
 F — Won by fall

Men's Greco-Roman 97 kg
 Legend
 F — Won by fall

Men's Greco-Roman 130 kg
 Legend
 F — Won by fall
 R — Retired

Women's freestyle

Women's freestyle 50 kg
 Legend
 F — Won by fall

Women's freestyle 53 kg
 Legend
 F — Won by fall

Women's freestyle 55 kg
 Legend
 F — Won by fall

Women's freestyle 57 kg
 Legend
 F — Won by fall

Women's freestyle 59 kg
 Legend
 F — Won by fall

Women's freestyle 62 kg
 Legend
 F — Won by fall

Women's freestyle 65 kg
 Legend
 F — Won by fall

Women's freestyle 68 kg
 Legend
 F — Won by fall

Women's freestyle 72 kg
 Legend
 F — Won by fall

Women's freestyle 76 kg
 Legend
 F — Won by fall

References

External links 
 Database
 Results Book

European Wrestling U23 Championships
European U23 Wrestling Championships
International wrestling competitions hosted by Romania
Sports competitions in Bucharest
World Wrestling U23 Championships
European U23 Wrestling Championships